Mineola is a station on the Main Line and Oyster Bay Branch of the Long Island Rail Road in the village of Mineola, New York. All trains for the Port Jefferson, Ronkonkoma, and Oyster Bay branches run through this station, as well as a few for the Montauk Branch. It is the eighth-busiest station on the LIRR in terms of weekday boardings, with 10,348 boardings per day in 2006.

Location

Mineola lies in the center of the village of the same name. Specifically, it is situated to the west of Mineola Boulevard between Station Road to the south and Front Street to the north.

As one of the LIRR's busiest stations and near the center of Nassau County, the Village of Mineola Planning Committee created a master plan for the town meant to encourage transit-oriented development within a few blocks' radius of the station. Much of the plan involves creating links in the surrounding street grid, streetscape improvements, and pedestrian zones. The Long Island Index, which aggregates data and plans about the island, has listed Mineola as one of the most high-profile targets for smart growth, as of 2010, noting that the town is about halfway through the process of revitalization.

History

Mineola station was originally built on the south side of the tracks in 1837 as "Branch station", then later renamed "Hempstead Branch station" when the Long Island Railroad was expanded to Hicksville. The station was renovated in June 1872, but a second depot was built between May and June 1883. This station was razed in 1923, and the third one was relocated to the north side of the tracks on September 22, 1923. The enclosed shelter was built at the old station house's location (See below). A reconstruction project took place in 2001.

With its connection to the Oyster Bay Branch, the Mineola station has always been a major railroad junction, but even more so in the 19th and much of the 20th Century. On the south side of the station, a wye existed between the power sub-station for a line that connected the West Hempstead Branch with the Oyster Bay Branch. Sometimes referred to as the Garden City Branch, the east branch of this wye began at Third Street then crossed Main Street, then the main line itself before connecting with the Oyster Bay Branch until it was eliminated in 1928. The rest of the line was eliminated in 1966.

Station enhancements

As part of the LIRR third track project, renovation of infrastructure around the Mineola station began in late 2018. Both platforms would be replaced and Platform B would be relocated. Canopies, benches, signage, and security cameras would be installed. The new platforms would be heated to facilitate snow removal. Amenities such as Wi-Fi, USB charging stations, artwork, and digital information displays would also be included as part of the renovations.

The construction of a new parking structure at Harrison Avenue began in fall 2018, followed by the start of reconstruction on the station itself in early 2019. The Second Street parking lot would also be expanded, and a park and ride parking lot at Main Street would be built. The dangerous grade crossing at Main Street was closed and replaced with a pedestrian overpass with two elevators. Additionally, the grade crossing at Willis Avenue further east of the station was eliminated and replaced with an underpass. The construction of the third track also required the replacement of a substation at the intersection of Main and Front Streets.

Station layout
Mineola has two side platforms and three tracks, both slightly-offset to accommodate 12 cars. The middle express track allows trains to bypass the station. The main station house is on the north side of the tracks, at Front Street and Mineola Boulevard. The station is wheelchair accessible and has a crossover for pedestrians. A smaller enclosed shelter is on the opposite (south) side of the tracks. The Oyster Bay Branch diverges at a junction just east of the station.

Westbound trains generally use Platform A and eastbound use Platform B, though during rush hours, peak-direction trains will stop at both platforms. The station is bypassed by select Port Jefferson Branch and Oyster Bay Branch trains, and by most Ronkonkoma Branch and Montauk Branch trains.

Mineola Intermodal Center
Nassau Inter-County Express, or NICE (formerly MTA Long Island Bus), operates bus service to the Mineola Intermodal Center on the south side of the station. Prior to the opening of the intermodal center on October 16, 2006, bus stops were located at Third Street, a block away from the station. Four NICE routes stop there, as well as local taxicab services.

Nassau Inter-County Express routes

References

External links

NASSAU Interlocking (The LIRR Today)
 Station House from Google Maps Street View (Exterior)
Platforms from Google Maps Street View
Station House from Google Maps Street View (Interior)

Mineola, New York
Railway stations in the United States opened in 1837
Long Island Rail Road stations in Nassau County, New York
Bus stations in New York (state)